Cheltenham railway station is located on the Frankston line in Victoria, Australia. It serves the south-eastern Melbourne suburb of Cheltenham, and it opened on 19 December 1881.

History

Cheltenham station opened on 19 December 1881, and was one of the earliest stations on the Frankston line. Like the suburb itself, the station was named after the Cheltenham Inn, which was opened by Charles Whorral in 1853. Whorral named the inn after his home town in Cheltenham, Gloucestershire, England.

In 1956, the former dock platform (Platform 1) was provided. A siding originally existed at this dock platform.

In 1966, boom barriers were provided at the former Park Road level crossing, which was located at the Up (Melbourne) end of the station. In 1972, a signal panel was installed in the station building to control trains terminating at Platform 1. It coincided with the introduction of automatic signalling between Highett and Cheltenham. Also in that year, boom barriers were provided at the former Charman Road level crossing, which was located at the Down (Frankston) end of the station.

In the early 1980s, a fourth track was laid into the bitumen of the former Park Street level crossing in preparation for triplication, but it was never connected.

There was previously a siding on the eastern side of the station, at the Up end. By 1980, the wiring for the siding was deactivated, when most of the siding was replaced with car parking, and was removed altogether by 1985.

On 8 March 1996, Cheltenham was upgraded to a Premium Station.

In 2010, Cheltenham was identified as a key part of the Cheltenham Major Activity Centre by the Brumby Labor Government, as part of its Melbourne 2030 strategic planning policy framework. In that year, Kingston City Council proposed a major redevelopment of the station environs, including a new station forecourt with a terraced plaza, giving more prominence to the heritage-listed buildings at the station, and a new taxi rank, similar to that at Mentone. However, the proposal was not implemented.

In October 2015, the station toilets underwent a refurbishment.

From its opening in 1881, the station was located between Mentone and Highett. The opening of Southland in 2017 meant that Southland replaced Highett as the closest station to Cheltenham in the Up direction.

In February 2017, it was announced that, as part of the Level Crossing Removal Project of the Andrews Labor Government, Cheltenham would be rebuilt in a rail trench, to allow the elimination of the level crossings at Charman and Park Roads. The trench, 1.26 kilometres in length, will be at least 30 metres wide. That will facilitate the reinstatement of the dock platform (Platform 1) as part of a duplication of the Down track. Road bridges will be constructed over the rail line at Charman and Park Roads. A multi–storey car-park will be built within the existing station car park. On 16 August 2020, the rebuilt station opened, after being built below ground in a trench, and a new station building constructed on a deck across the railway line. The former station building on Platforms 1 and 2 was later donated to the Mornington Railway Preservation Society.

Incidents
On 10 May 2008, former The Saddle Club actress Jessica Jacobs died instantly from her injuries after she was hit by a train. On 16 March 2012, a motorist was killed after a train hit his car at the former Charman Road level crossing.

Platforms and services

Cheltenham is serviced by Metro Trains' Frankston line services. Until March 2020, it had two side platforms and one dock platform. The latter was served by one afternoon terminating service from Flinders Street, that returned empty to the city, but from 12 October 2014, extra weekday Flinders Street bound services began to use the platform.

Following the reconstruction and reconfiguration of the station and tracks, as of July 2020, Platform 1 has been turned into a through track, servicing all Flinders Street trains. The station now has the following configuration:

Platform 1:
  all stations and limited express services to Flinders Street, Werribee and Williamstown

Platform 2:
  all stations and limited express services to Flinders Street, Werribee and Williamstown

Platform 3:
  all stations services to Frankston

Transport links

Kinetic Melbourne operates three bus routes via Cheltenham station, under contract to Public Transport Victoria:
 : Westfield Southland – St Kilda station
 : Westfield Southland – St Kilda station
 : Westfield Southland – St Kilda station

Ventura Bus Lines operates four bus routes via Cheltenham station, under contract to Public Transport Victoria:
 : Dandenong station – Brighton
 : Dandenong station – Brighton
 : Chadstone Shopping Centre – Sandringham station
 : Hampton station – Berwick station

Gallery

References

External links
 Melway map

Premium Melbourne railway stations
Railway stations in Melbourne
Railway stations in Australia opened in 1881
Cheltenham, Victoria
Railway stations in the City of Kingston (Victoria)
Railway stations in the City of Bayside